NGC 1532, also known as Haley's Coronet, is an edge-on barred spiral galaxy located approximately 50 million light-years from the Solar System in the constellation Eridanus. The galaxy was discovered by James Dunlop on 29 October 1826. One supernova, SN 1981A, has been recorded in the galaxy.

Bar
NGC 1532 is one of many edge-on spiral galaxies that possesses a box-shaped bulge. This is an indication that the bulge is actually a bar. Such bars are easy to detect in face-on galaxies, where the structures can be identified visually. In inclined galaxies such as this one, however, careful analyses are needed to distinguish between bulges and bar structures.

Companion galaxies and interactions
NGC 1532 may possess several dwarf companion galaxies. The galaxy is clearly interacting with one of these galaxies, the amorphous dwarf galaxy NGC 1531. The tidal forces from this interaction have created unusual plumes above the disk of NGC 1532.

NGC 1532 is also an outlying member of the Fornax Cluster.

See also
 NGC 4631 - an edge-on spiral galaxy also interacting with a dwarf companion.

References

External links

 
 
 

Barred spiral galaxies
Peculiar galaxies
Interacting galaxies
Eridanus (constellation)
1532
14638
Discoveries by James Dunlop